Monteleone may refer to:

 Monteleone (surname), an Italian surname
 Monteleone chariot, an Etruscan chariot
 Hotel Monteleone, an hotel in  New Orleans, Louisiana, United States of America

Places 
 Monteleone d'Orvieto, Italian comune
 Monteleone di Calabria (now Vibo Valentia), Italian comune
 Monteleone di Fermo, Italian comune
 Monteleone di Puglia, Italian comune
 Monteleone di Spoleto, Italian comune
 Monteleone Rocca Doria, Italian comune
 Monteleone Sabino, Italian comune
 Inverno e Monteleone, Italian comune